Heywood and Royton was a parliamentary constituency centred on the Heywood and Royton districts in the north-west of Greater Manchester.  It returned one Member of Parliament (MP)  to the House of Commons of the Parliament of the United Kingdom.

The constituency was created for the 1950 general election, and abolished for the 1983 general election, when its territory was largely divided between the new constituencies of Heywood & Middleton and Oldham Central & Royton.

Boundaries

The Borough of Heywood, and the Urban Districts of Crompton, Littleborough, Milnrow, Royton, Wardle, and Whitworth.

Members of Parliament

Elections

Elections in the 1950s

Elections in the 1960s

Elections in the 1970s

References

Parliamentary constituencies in North West England (historic)
Constituencies of the Parliament of the United Kingdom established in 1950
Constituencies of the Parliament of the United Kingdom disestablished in 1983
Politics of the Metropolitan Borough of Oldham
Politics of the Metropolitan Borough of Rochdale
Heywood, Greater Manchester